Border Security Force Sporting Club is an Indian institutional multi-sports club known for its football team. The club is based in Jalandhar, Punjab, and currently competing in the Punjab State Super Football League.

History
The team is well known for winning the prestigious Durand Cup on seven occasions during the 1960s, 1970s, and 1980s. Legendary player Sukhwinder Singh represented the club from 1974 to 1978.

The team also spent one season in the old National Football League during the 1999–2000 season. They were relegated after finishing in 11th place.

Honours

League
National Football League II
Champions (1): 1998–99
Punjab State Super Football League
Champions (5): 1985–86, 1988, 2000–01, 2008 2021–22

Cup
Durand Cup
Champions (7): 1968–69, 1971–72, 1973–74, 1975–76, 1976, 1981, 1988
Sait Nagjee Football Tournament
Champions (1): 1970
All Airlines Gold Cup
Champions (3): 1994, 1997, 1998–99
Sikkim Governor's Gold Cup
Champions (3): 2002, 2005, 2012
Independence Day Cup
Champions (6): 1993, 1998, 1999, 2006, 2008–09, 2018
Runners-up (3): 2007, 2016, 2019
Gurdarshan Memorial Cup
Champions (4): 1986, 1994, 1998, 1981, 2005
Mammen Mappillai Trophy
Champions (1): 1976 
 Churachand Singh Trophy
 Champions (1): 1985
 Darjeeling Gold Cup
 Champions (1): 1980
 Mohan Kumar Mangalam Football Tournament
 Champions (6): 1993, 1996, 1997, 2002, 2003, 2004
 Runners-up (1): 1999
 Guru Gobind Singh Trophy
 Champions (1): 2005
 Bandodkar Gold Trophy
 Runners-up (1): 1986

Other departments

Field hockey
Boarder Security Force have its hockey team that participated in Beighton Cup, one of the oldest field hockey tournaments in the world. They also appeared in Bombay Gold Cup.

Honours
 Beighton Cup
Champions (5): 1971, 1996, 1998, 2003, 2005
Runners-up (4): 1997, 2001, 2006, 2007

Bombay Gold Cup
Champions (8): 1968, 1969, 1970, 1973, 1974, 1980, 1981, 1992

Guru Tegh Bahadur Gold Cup
Champions (1): 2000

Surjit Memorial Hockey Tournament
Champions (2): 1998, 1999
Runners-up (4): 1986, 1988, 1989, 2003

Senior Nehru Hockey Tournament
Champions (7): 1975, 1977, 1978, 1981, 1987, 1996, 1996
Runners-up (6): 1979, 1984, 1992, 1993, 1999, 2004

See also

 List of football clubs in India

References

Further reading

External links

Border Security Force at the-aiff.com

Football clubs in Punjab, India
Sport in Jalandhar
Police association football clubs in India
Organizations with year of establishment missing